Petr Luxa and Radek Štěpánek were the defending champions and won in the final 6–0, 6–7(4–7), [11–9] against Petr Pála and Pavel Vízner.

Seeds

  Joshua Eagle /  Sandon Stolle (quarterfinals)
  Petr Pála /  Pavel Vízner (final)
  David Prinosil /  Jeff Tarango (first round)
  Juan Ignacio Chela /  David Nalbandian (first round)

Draw

External links
 2002 BMW Open Doubles Draw

2002 ATP Tour
2002 BMW Open